Rupilia is a genus of skeletonizing leaf beetles in the family Chrysomelidae. There are about 15 described species in Rupilia, found in Australasia.

Species
These 15 species belong to the genus Rupilia:
 Rupilia angulaticollis Blackburn, 1900
 Rupilia approximans Blackburn, 1900
 Rupilia brevipennis Blackburn, 1896
 Rupilia cavicollis Lea, 1925
 Rupilia cribrata Lea, 1925
 Rupilia excelsa Blackburn, 1896
 Rupilia impressa Blackburn, 1889
 Rupilia insignis Lea, 1925
 Rupilia microptera Lea, 1925
 Rupilia ruficollis Clark, 1864
 Rupilia rugulosa Blackburn, 1892
 Rupilia suturalis Lea, 1925
 Rupilia tricolor Lea, 1925
 Rupilia viridiaenea Clark, 1864
 Rupilia viridipennis Lea, 1925

References

Further reading

 

Galerucinae
Chrysomelidae genera
Taxa named by Hamlet Clark